Montecarlo is a denominazione di origine controllata (DOC) in northern Tuscany, Italy.  The vineyards surround the small town of Montecarlo which is located  close to Lucca and Pisa. Montecarlo wines are unusual for the region in that they are commonly made from the Sémillon, Sauvignon blanc and Pinot bianco grape varietals.  This is unusual as most Tuscan white wines are made from Trebbiano and Malvasia grapes. Wines from the region are often called the best Tuscan whites.

DOC Regulations
The DOC is defined under the following laws:

The DOC bianco allows between 40% to 60% Trebbiano Toscano, and between 40% to 60% Semillon, Pinot gris, Pinot bianco, Vermentino, Sauvignon blanc and/or Roussane, with no more than 10% of any single one.  

The DOC rosso is 50% to 75% Sangiovese, 5% to 15% Canaiolo, 10% to 15% Ciliegiolo, Colorino, Malvasia nera, Sjriak, Cabernet Franc, Cabernet Sauvignon and/or Merlot, and up to 20% other red varietals.

References

External links
 Montecarlo DOC at italianmade.com.

Italian DOC
Wines of Tuscany